Deirdre Davis (born 1963) is a British actress. She is known for her role as Eileen Donachie in the BBC Scotland soap opera River City, which she starred in for almost 14 years, from its first broadcast on 24 September 2002 until May 2016. She has also appeared in the films Orphans (1998), The Debt Collector (1999), The Magdalene Sisters (2002), and The Rocket Post (2004).

Early life and career
Davis was born in Liverpool England, to Glaswegian parents. When she was a toddler, her parents moved back to Cardonald, Glasgow. She attended Penilee Secondary School, and it was only then that she realised her interest in drama. After secondary school, Deirdre studied a course in languages. However, she quit after a year to become a singer in a soul band.

At the age of 25, Davis joined drama school. Soon after graduating she got roles in theatre plays and short films.

Career
In 2002, Davis joined the cast of River City, playing the character of Eileen Donachie. She left the program in 2016, becoming the final member of the original cast to leave the show.

Davis joined the summer season of shows at Pitlochry Festival Theatre in 2022. She performed in renditions of Noises Off, Sherlock Holmes, Little Women and Private Lives.

External links

References

Scottish soap opera actresses
Living people
Actresses from Liverpool
1963 births